Gross v. FBL Financial Services, Inc., 557 U.S. 167 (2009), was a case decided by the Supreme Court of the United States in 2009, involving the standard of proof required for a claim under the Age Discrimination in Employment Act (ADEA).

Jack Gross, an employee of FBL Financial Services, Inc., was transferred to another position and a former subordinate took on many of Gross' old responsibilities. They both received the same compensation, but Gross believed his reassignment was a demotion. Gross brought suit against FBL in April 2004 in District Court, claiming ADEA violations. The court found in his favor and awarded him $5,000,000 in lost compensation. The United States Court of Appeals for the Eighth Circuit reversed the decision. The Supreme Court affirmed that reversal, finding that a plaintiff must prove by preponderance of evidence, that age was the "but for" cause of the adverse employment action.

References 

 Keep Young and Beautiful — Especially At Work

External links
 

United States Supreme Court cases
United States employment discrimination case law
2009 in United States case law
United States Supreme Court cases of the Roberts Court
United States statutory interpretation case law